Zoom, Zoom, Superman!  is a 1973 Filipino parody film of DC Comics superhero Superman. The film stars Ariel Ureta as the titular superhero, and is also his debut film. Filipino director Joey Gosiengfiao, who is known for his campy films, directed this film as one of his firsts. Elwood Perez and Ishmael Bernal were also co-directors. The film got three directors because it is a trilogy in one film and each director directed each episode.

The film had copyright infringement issues even though it is a parody, a work that is protected from copyright violation because of the fair use principle. From 1973 to 1981, it was the highest grossing film in Philippine cinema, even defeating other known box-office breaking actors during those times including Dolphy and Fernando Poe Jr. This record was surpassed by the 1981 film Dear Heart that top-billed Sharon Cuneta and Gabby Concepcion.

Cast
 Ariel Ureta as Superman
 Rita Gomez as The Mad Scientist
 Boots Anson-Roa as Superman's Creator
 Rosanna Ortiz	as The Witch
 Liza Lorena as The Millionairess
 Celia Rodriguez as The Spiderwoman
 Edgar Mortiz as The Jewel Thief
 Gina Alajar as The Possessed
 Max Alvarado as Tarzan
 Gina Pareño as The Ape Monster
 Cloyd Robinson as The Leprechaun
 Orestes Ojeda as The Man in the Mirror

References

External links
 

Philippine fantasy comedy films